Warnice  is a village in Pyrzyce County, West Pomeranian Voivodeship, in north-western Poland. It is the seat of the gmina (administrative district) called Gmina Warnice.

See also 

 History of Pomerania

References

Warnice